This is a list of ambassadors to Latvia. Note that some ambassadors are responsible for more than one country while others are directly accredited to Riga.

Current Ambassadors to Latvia

See also
 Foreign relations of Latvia
 List of diplomatic missions in Latvia
 List of diplomatic missions of Latvia

References
 THE DIPLOMATIC LIST

 
 
Latvia